Saint-Félix-de-Sorgues (literally Saint-Félix of Sorgues; Languedocien: Sant Faliç) is a commune in the Aveyron department in southern France.

Geography
The village lies on the right bank of the Sorgues, which flows west through the middle of the commune.

Population

See also
Communes of the Aveyron department

References

Communes of Aveyron
Aveyron communes articles needing translation from French Wikipedia